The Dynamic Duo, also known as Cooperation 7, is a South Korean variety show distributed and syndicated by tvN every Friday at 23:30 (KST).

Cast
Lee Kyung-kyu 
Park Myeong-su 
Kim Gura
Seo Jang-hoon 
Eun Ji-won 
Kwon Hyuk-soo 
Lee Gi-kwang

Plot
The cast will be paired up and they will then do their very best to prove that they are the best variety duo in Korea's entertainment industry by going through a series of challenges and battles.

Ratings

References

External links
  

Seoul Broadcasting System original programming
South Korean variety television shows
Mass media in Korea
South Korean game shows
2017 South Korean television series debuts
Korean-language television shows
2017 South Korean television series endings
Television game shows with incorrect disambiguation